Charles Pinckney (governor) (1757–1824) was a U.S. Senator from South Carolina from 1798 to 1801, and also served in the South Carolina State Senate. Senator Pinckney may also refer to:

Bertine Pinckney (1824–1909), Wisconsin State Senate
Charles Cotesworth Pinckney (1746–1825), South Carolina State Senate
Clementa C. Pinckney (1973–2015), South Carolina State Senate

See also
William Pinkney (1764–1822), U.S. Senator from Maryland from 1819 to 1822